The MV Anshun was a   motor vessel built by Scotts Shipbuilding and Engineering Company Limited, Greenock in 1930 for The China Navigation Company for the Chinese coastal passenger service.

Wartime service
With the outbreak of World War II, the Anshun was requisitioned by the Admiralty as a stores ship at Freetown, returned to her owners in 1940. The ship was damaged by a bomb on 10 December 1941 at Manila, Philippines. She was diverted to Australia and taken for operation under the Ministry of War Transport for wartime service and in May–June 1942 allocated for operation under United States Army control.

Anshun and Arunta entered the bay on the morning of 6 September and berthed at the pontoon jetty at Gili Gili to begin unloading with intentions to put to sea for safety during the night but orders were given by local authorities to continue unloading under her cargo lights through the night while Arunta departed to join s Jacob and Swan holding at sea to the south. Shortly after 10 p.m.  she came under fire from the Japanese cruiser  and destroyer  during the battle of Milne Bay. Anshun was hit by the fire from the cruiser taking ten hits settling by the head before rolling onto her side. Two of her American gunners were killed and one American and one ship's gunner were wounded. She was left on her side until late 1944 when she was salvaged, raised, patched and towed to Sydney.

During preparations to advance from Buna toward Lae and Salamaua marking of channels for safe passage of the amphibious forces in the dangerous waters between Milne Bay and Buna was constrained by shortage of material with the steaming and side lights of Anshun salvaged and used in the effort to make Buna a twenty-four-hour port.

Anshun was later salvaged and in 1944 towed to Sydney where she was laid up.

Postwar service
She was acquired by James Patrick & Company Pty Limited, underwent repairs at Cockatoo Island Dockyard and was renamed MS Culcairn. Culcairn operated on the Australian East Coast trade from 1946 to 1962.

Citations

References

External links
Australian War Memorial records search result (photos)

1930 ships
Ships built on the River Clyde
1942 in Papua New Guinea
World War II shipwrecks in the Pacific Ocean
South West Pacific theatre of World War II
Maritime incidents in September 1942